Beaulieu-en-Argonne (literally Beaulieu in Argonne) is a commune in the Meuse department in the Grand Est region in northeastern France.

The Abbey of Beaulieu was founded and governed for thirty years by Saint Rodingus (died c. 680), an Irish monk.

Population

See also
Communes of the Meuse department

References

Communes of Meuse (department)